Jeffrey Charles Cuttell (born 1959) is a British Anglican priest. He was Dean of Derby from 2007 until 2010.

Biography
He was born in 1959 in Giltbrook, Nottinghamshire, England. He educated at the University of Birmingham and Trinity College, Bristol. He was ordained in 1988. His first post was in Normanton, West Yorkshire after which he was a producer and presenter for BBC religious programmes. He was Rector of Astbury with Smallwood immediately before his time as Dean; and Chaplain at HM Prison Werrington afterwards.

References

1947 births
Alumni of the University of Birmingham
Alumni of Trinity College, Bristol
Provosts and Deans of Derby
Living people
People from the Borough of Broxtowe